The women's 50 m manikin carry in lifesaving at the 2001 World Games took place on 25 August 2001 at the Akita Prefectural Pool in Akita, Japan.

Competition format
A total of 26 athletes entered the competition. The best nine athletes from preliminary round qualifies to the final.

Results

Preliminary

Final

References

External links
 Results on IWGA website

Lifesaving at the 2001 World Games